Senator Soucy may refer to:

David Soucy (born 1957), Vermont State Senate
Donna Soucy (born 1967), New Hampshire State Senate